Eupithecia coquimbo is a moth in the family Geometridae. It is found the Region of Coquimbo (El Qui Province) in Chile. The habitat consists of the Coquimban Desert Biotic Province.

The length of the forewings is about 11 mm for males and 10.5 mm for females. The forewings are dark grey. The hindwings are greyish white anteriorly, becoming dark grey distally. Adults have been recorded on wing in October and November.

Etymology
The specific name is based on the type locality.

References

Moths described in 1991
coquimbo
Moths of South America
Endemic fauna of Chile